Thiirane, more commonly known as ethylene sulfide, is the cyclic chemical compound with the formula C2H4S.  It is the smallest sulfur-containing heterocycle and the simplest episulfide.  Like many organosulfur compounds, this species has a highly unpleasant odour.  Thiirane is also used to describe any derivative of the parent ethylene sulfide.

Structure
According to electron diffraction, the C-C and C-S distances in ethylene sulfide are respectively 1.473 and 1.811 Å. The C-C-S and C-S-C angles are respectively 66.0 and 48.0°.

Preparation and reactions
It can be prepared by the reaction of ethylene carbonate and KSCN.  For this purpose the KSCN is first melted under vacuum to remove water.
KSCN  + C2H4O2CO  →  KOCN  + C2H4S  +  CO2

Ethylenesulfide adds to amines to afford 2-mercaptoethylamines, which are good chelating ligands.
C2H4S   +  R2NH  →  R2NCH2CH2SH
This process is often called mercaptoethylation.

Oxidation of thiirane with periodate gives ethylene episulfoxide.

References

Episulfides